The Zee Cine Award Best Screenplay is the technical award.

The winners are listed below:

See also 

 Zee Cine Awards
 Bollywood
 Cinema of India

External links
Winners of the 2007 Zee Cine Awards

Zee Cine Awards